Going Straight is a 1933 British comedy film directed by John Rawlins and starring Moira Lynd, Helen Ferrers and Joan Marion. It was made at Teddington Studios as a quota quickie.

Cast
 Moira Lynd as Peggy Edwards  
 Helen Ferrers as Lady Peckham  
 Tracy Holmes 
 Joan Marion 
 Hal Walters 
 Huntley Wright 
 Eric Stanley 
 George Merritt 
 Gilbert Davis

References

Bibliography
 Chibnall, Steve. Quota Quickies: The Birth of the British 'B' Film. British Film Institute, 2007.
 Low, Rachael. Filmmaking in 1930s Britain. George Allen & Unwin, 1985.
 Wood, Linda. British Films, 1927-1939. British Film Institute, 1986.

External links

1933 films
British comedy films
1933 comedy films
Films shot at Teddington Studios
Warner Bros. films
Quota quickies
Films directed by John Rawlins
British black-and-white films
1930s English-language films
1930s British films
English-language comedy films